Minister of Ecology, Spatial Planning and Urbanism is the person in charge of the Ministry of Ecology, Spatial Planning and Urbanism of Montenegro (Ministarstvo ekologije, prostornog planiranja i urbanizma). The ministry was formed in 2020 with reorganization of the Ministry of Sustainable Development and Tourism (Montenegrin: Ministarstvo održivog razvoja i turizma).

Ministers of Sustainable Development and Tourism, since 2006

References

Government of Montenegro